Andrew Ian Rolley (born 1969), is a male former swimmer who competed for Great Britain and England.

Swimming career
Rolley represented Great Britain in the 1992 Summer Olympics.

Rolley became a National champion after winning the 1991 ASA National British Championships in the 400 metres medley. He represented England in the 400 metres individual medley, at the 1990 Commonwealth Games in Auckland, New Zealand.

Personal life
His older brother Duncan Rolley was also an international swimmer and competed in the 1986 Commonwealth Games.

References

1969 births
English male swimmers
Swimmers at the 1990 Commonwealth Games
Swimmers at the 1992 Summer Olympics
Olympic swimmers of Great Britain
Living people
Commonwealth Games competitors for England